Surab (also Romanized as Sūrāb) is a village in Howmeh Rural District, in the Central District of Iranshahr County, Sistan and Baluchestan Province, Iran. At the 2006 census, its population was 338, in 72 families.

References 

Populated places in Iranshahr County